Goldbug were a British pop band in the 1990s. The band were formed in 
London and Brighton in 1995 by a former member of the Beatmasters, Richard Walmsley, drummer Tony Horkins and DJ Adil Magik, with a session vocalist, Sandy McKenzie, who was recruited through an advertisement in Melody Maker.

Goldbug are best remembered for their UK hit single with a cover of Led Zeppelin's "Whole Lotta Love", also sampling "Asteroid" (the Pearl & Dean theme tune), and released on 15 January 1996 on the Acid Jazz label.  "Whole Lotta Love" was played heavily by Chris Evans on the Radio 1 Breakfast Show, and the track entered the UK Singles Chart on 20 January 1996 at number 3, and stayed in the charts for 5 weeks. It hit the number one spot on the ITV chart, Dance chart and Indie chart. The band made their sole appearance on Top of the Pops on 25 January 1996, performing the song with replacement singer, Katherine Ellis.

Tony Horkins and Adil Magik left the band after contractual issues with Walmsley at the end of 1996. Their sole follow-up single, "Real Hip Mary", was released by EMI but failed to reach the top 75 in 1997.  
In 2000, Walmsley sued Acid Jazz over unpaid royalties relating to the "Whole Lotta Love" single.  He was successful, receiving many thousands of pounds.   Due to the royalty disputes, McKenzie received no money from the band's short existence.

Former lead vocalist McKenzie experienced much hardship after the dissolution of the band, having almost died due to a severe assault, and experiencing homelessness. Her attacker is now in prison.

Discography

Singles

References

External links
Performance of 'Whole Lotta Love' on French television
Performance of 'Real Hip Mary' on British television
Original video of 'Whole Lotta Love'

Musical groups established in 1995
Musical groups disestablished in 1996
English pop music groups
musicians from Wolverhampton
Musical groups from West Midlands (county)
Acid Jazz Records artists